Tinker Bell is a direct-to-video computer-animated fantasy film series produced by DisneyToon Studios as part of the Disney Fairies franchise. Voices of Mae Whitman, Lucy Liu, Raven-Symoné, America Ferrera, Kristin Chenoweth and Pamela Adlon are featured in the films. Six feature films and one TV special were produced: Tinker Bell, Tinker Bell and the Lost Treasure, Tinker Bell and the Great Fairy Rescue, Secret of the Wings, Pixie Hollow Games (the special), The Pirate Fairy, and Tinker Bell and the Legend of the NeverBeast. The series is a spin-off of and prequel to Peter Pan.

Films

Tinker Bell (2008)

Tinker Bell (Mae Whitman) is born from the first laugh of a baby and is brought by the winds to Pixie Hollow (which is part of the island of Never Land). She learns that her talent is to be one of the tinkers, the fairies who make and fix things. Two other tinker fairies, Bobble (Rob Paulsen) and Clank (Jeff Bennett) teach her their craft and tell her about the fairies who visit the mainland to bring each season. Tink is thrilled and can't wait to go to the mainland for spring.

While out working, she meets a water fairy named Silvermist (Lucy Liu); a garden fairy named Rosetta (Kristin Chenoweth); a light fairy named Iridessa (Raven-Symoné), and an animal fairy named Fawn (America Ferrera). After meeting them, she notices an ill-tempered fast-flying fairy named Vidia (Pamela Adlon), who immediately dislikes her because of her unusually strong talent. Vidia challenges her to prove she'll be able to go to the mainland, and Tink creates several inventions out of Lost Things (to which some other fairies see as junk) that she found on the beach, which she shows to the Minister of Spring (Steve Valentine). But Tinker Bell soon learns from Queen Clarion (Anjelica Huston) that only nature-talent fairies visit the mainland.

Desperate to help change the seasons in the mainland, Tink tries her hand at nature skills—making dewdrops with Silvermist, lighting fireflies with Iridessa, and trying with Fawn to teach baby birds to fly but she fails miserably at all of these when she gets attacked by a hawk. Meanwhile, Bobble and Clank cover for Tink when questioned by Fairy Mary (Jane Horrocks), the tinker fairy overseer. When Tinker Bell returns, she tries to explain, but Mary simply responds that she knows, and expresses her disappointment with Tink's actions.

On the beach, Tinker Bell finds parts of a music box and figures out how to put them together. Iridessa, Fawn, Silvermist, and Rosetta witness her doing this, then tell her that she was tinkering and that she should be proud of her talent—if this is what she's good at, the mainland shouldn't matter. But Tinker Bell still wants to go to the mainland. She asks Rosetta if she'll still teach her to be a garden fairy, but Rosetta says that tinkering is Tinker Bell's natural talent.

As a last resort, Tinker Bell asks Vidia for help in becoming a garden fairy. Vidia craftily tells her that capturing the sprinting thistles would prove her worth. However, once she sees Tink making progress, she lets the captured thistles loose, and in attempting to recapture them, Tink destroys all the preparations for spring. After seeing the destruction she caused, Tink decides to run, but after talking with the dust-keeper Terence (Jesse McCartney) about how important his job is, she realizes the importance of a tinker.

Tinker Bell redeems herself by using Lost Things to invent machines that quicken the process of doing tedious tasks, such as decorating flowers, painting bugs, planting seeds, etc. This allows the other fairies to get back on schedule, thus saving the arrival of spring. Vidia is punished for prompting her to cause the chaos, and Queen Clarion allows Tink to join the nature-talent fairies when they bring spring to the mainland. Tinker Bell is given the task of delivering the music box to its original owner (shown to be Wendy Darling). After, she goes with her friends across the continent while the narrator ends by saying that when lost toys are found or a broken clock starts to work, "it all means that one very special fairy might be near."

Tinker Bell and the Lost Treasure (2009)

Friendly fairy Tinker Bell (Mae Whitman) means well but often gets into trouble. All the same, Pixie Hollow has entrusted her with making sure their magical moonstone keeps their pixie dust in plentiful supply. But tragedy strikes when Tinker Bell fumbles this important task—accidentally breaking the moonstone. In order to get it back into one piece, Tinker Bell will have to find an enchanted mirror and accept a little assistance from pestering pixie Terence (Jesse McCartney).

Tinker Bell and the Great Fairy Rescue (2010)

Years before meeting Wendy and the Lost Boys, Tinker Bell (Mae Whitman) met Lizzy (Lauren Mote), a little girl with a steadfast belief in the power of pixie dust and the magic land of fairies. During the fairies' summer visit to the flowering meadows of England, two very different worlds unite for the first time and Tink develops a special bond with a curious child in need of a friend. As her fellow fairies Iridessa (Raven-Symoné), Silvermist (Lucy Liu), Rosetta (Kristin Chenoweth), Fawn (Angela Bartys), and Vidia (Pamela Adlon) launch a daring rescue, Tinker Bell takes a huge risk, putting her own safety and the future of all fairykind in jeopardy.

Tinker Bell and the Secret of Wings (2012)

Secret of the Wings (originally titled Tinker Bell and the Mysterious Winter Woods) was released on DVD on October 23, 2012. Tinker Bell (Mae Whitman) crosses over to the forbidden area in Winter Woods, where it is always winter. While there her wings begin to sparkle so she sets off on a quest to discover why. She is overjoyed to learn that her wings sparkled because she was close to her sister, Periwinkle (Lucy Hale). They were born when a baby's laugh split in two. They visit for a few hours before Tinker Bell is told she has to leave. Determined to help her sister visit Pixie Hollow, she crafts a contraption that grates snow to keep Peri cold during her visit. The device malfunctions badly, causing a freeze to slowly envelop Pixie Hollow.

Tinker Bell flies to Winter Woods to get Periwinkle and her friends to help save Pixie Hollow. They realize that frost protects the trees in Winter Woods from the cold, so the winter fairies all work together to frost the trees of Pixie Hollow to save them from the accelerating freeze. They learn, however, that when Tink crashed in Winter Woods she tore her wing, and broken wings can't be repaired. But when Tink and Peri come together their wings again sparkle, and they learn that identical wings can heal each other, so they restore Tink's broken wing. They also discover that winter fairies can frost the wings of warm-weather fairies, keeping them from breaking in the cold, thus allowing them to visit their friends in Winter Woods.

Tinker Bell and the Pirate Fairy (2014)

Another feature-length film, titled The Pirate Fairy, (originally titled Quest for the Queen) was released on April 1, 2014. The film was originally scheduled for Fall 2013, but another DisneyToon Studios film, Planes, took its place. A trailer for the film was released on the Secret of the Wings Blu-ray and DVD on October 23, 2012. It was directed by the Secret of the Wings director, Peggy Holmes. The film introduced new characters, Zarina, voiced by Christina Hendricks, and James aka Captain Hook, voiced by Tom Hiddleston. Carlos Ponce also voiced one of the characters in the film.

When a misunderstood dust-keeper fairy named Zarina steals Pixie Hollow's all-important Blue Pixie Dust and flies away to join forces with the pirates of Skull Rock, Tinker Bell and her fairy friends must embark on the adventure of a lifetime to return it to its rightful place. However, in the midst of their pursuit of Zarina, Tink's world is turned upside down. She and her friends find that their respective talents have been switched and they have to race against time to retrieve the Blue Pixie Dust and return home to save Pixie Hollow.

Tinker Bell and the Legend of the NeverBeast (2015)

Tinker Bell and the Legend of the NeverBeast was released in cinemas in selected markets from March 2015, and was released direct-to-video in the United States on March 3, 2015. It was directed by Steve Loter and produced by Makul Wigert. Composer Joel McNeely returned to the film. Mae Whitman, Lucy Liu, Raven-Symoné, Megan Hilty, Pamela Adlon and Anjelica Huston reprise their roles of Tinker Bell, Silvermist, Iridessa, Rosetta, Vidia and Queen Clarion. Ginnifer Goodwin replaces Angela Bartys as the voice of Fawn in this film. Rosario Dawson and Olivia Holt join the cast as new characters Nyx and Morgan, respectively.

When Fawn meets a legendary creature, the Neverbeast, she befriends the creature in no time. But when she learns that the creature could be part of a terrible event, she will have to trust her instincts in order to save her new friend and all of Pixie Hollow.

Unreleased films

Scrapped first film
The early draft for the first Tinker Bell film, alternatively titled Tinker Bell and the Ring of Belief in unreleased promotional material, designed Tinker Bell and her friends traveling to the mainland to restore children’s belief in fairies. In addition, the film would also show how Tinker Bell met Peter Pan and encountered a young girl from an orphanage in London. Captain Hook, the pirates, and the Lost Boys were also planned to be featured in the film as key factors. Trailers of the original film were included in several Disney DVD releases, with the initial release date being 2007. Due to budget constraints and the film being deemed  “virtually unwatchable”, the script underwent many rewrites and 90% of the completed prototype film is scrapped. The film ended up being delayed to 2008 with an entirely new storyline.

Cancelled seventh film
In addition to Tinker Bell and the Legend of the NeverBeast, Disney also had plans for a seventh film. In 2015, The Hollywood Reporter stated that the seventh film was canceled due to story problems. The title of the film and the storyline were unknown. On June 28, 2018, The Walt Disney Company had officially closed the film series' production studio, DisneyToon Studios.

Cancelled eighth film
On August 28, 2022, Stephen Anderson stated on Twitter about working on an eighth Tinker Bell film in late 2014/early 2015. The working title of the film was “Tink Meets Peter”. It was intended to be the final installment in the Tinker Bell film series and a direct prequel to Walt Disney’s 1953 film, Peter Pan. The storyline would show how Peter came to Neverland, the genesis of Peter and Tink’s relationship, how Peter cut off Hook’s hand, etc. The film was under production during the time home video marketing was plummeting and DisneyToon Studios’ closure. All production on the seventh and eighth Tinker Bell films were eventually cancelled once DisneyToon Studios officially closed in June 2018.

Live-action film 
In 2015, it was announced that Tink, a live-action film, with Reese Witherspoon playing Tinker Bell and Victoria Strouse writing the script, was in development. In 2020, the development on the project was in question following the casting of Yara Shahidi as Tinker Bell in Peter Pan & Wendy. In 2021, the project re-entered development as a part of Gary Marsh's overall deal with Disney. Witherspoon is still attached to the project as a producer and Maria Melnik (Escape Room) was hired to rewrite the script.

Short films

Pixie Hollow Games (2011)

Originally planned to feature the entire ensemble cast of the earlier films in Olympic-style games spanning the four seasons, presumably due to the original plot vetoed by the producers, the story was scaled back into a shorter scenario focusing primarily on Rosetta (Megan Hilty, replacing Kristin Chenoweth) and a new fairy character, Chloe (Brenda Song). They are teamed up against Rosetta's will representing the "garden fairies" in a competition in which they hope to unseat the undefeated "storm fairies". They overcome their differences and Rosetta's fear of getting dirty, to emerge victorious at the end of the games.

Pixie Hollow Bake Off (2013)

A six-minute short film, titled Pixie Hollow Bake Off, aired in the United Kingdom on October 20, 2013, on Disney Channel. Lisa Faulkner provided a voice for a baking fairy named Gelata.

The short was released in the United States as a bonus DVD in a Walmart-exclusive edition of The Pirate Fairy on Blu-ray Disc, but with Giada De Laurentiis as the voice of Gelata. In July 2014 the short was made available on the digital movie service Disney Movies Anywhere.

Theme songs

Reception

Critical reception

Commercial performance
According to The Hollywood Reporter, the first four full-length films (Tinker Bell, Tinker Bell and the Lost Treasure, Tinker Bell and the Great Fairy Rescue, and Secret of the Wings) were made for $30 million to $35 million.

Recurring characters

 Tinker Bell (voiced by Mae Whitman) is a talented tinker fairy and Peter Pan’s closest friend and sidekick. Prior to meeting Peter, Tinker Bell was born in the fairyland, Pixie Hollow in Neverland, and has many adventures with her fairy friends. In Secret of the Wings, Tinker Bell learns she has a sister named Periwinkle.
 Rosetta (voiced by Kristin Chenoweth from 2008 to 2010, and Megan Hilty from 2011 to 2015) is a garden fairy and speaks with a Southern accent.
 Fawn (voiced by America Ferrera in 2008, Angela Bartys from 2009 to 2014, and Ginnifer Goodwin in 2015) is an animal fairy and is of Latin descent.
 Iridessa (voiced by Raven-Symoné) is a light fairy and is of African descent.
 Silvermist (voiced by Lucy Liu) is a water fairy and is of East-Asian descent.
 Vidia (voiced by Pamela Adlon) is a fast-flying fairy. She was originally Tinker Bell’s rival, but later reformed and is now friends with her.
 Clank (voiced by Jeff Bennett) is a tinker sparrow man and Bobble’s best friend.
 Bobble (voiced by Rob Paulsen) is a tinker sparrow man and Clank’s best friend.
 Terence (voiced by Jesse McCartney) is a dust-keeper sparrow man and Tinker Bell’s best friend. He has romantic feelings for Tink, but she is oblivious to this.

Crew

See also 

 FernGully: The Last Rainforest
 FernGully 2: The Magical Rescue
 Epic
 Arrietty

References

External links
 

 
Film series introduced in 2008
Disney direct-to-video animated films
DisneyToon Studios animated films
Computer-animated films
Peter Pan (franchise)
Disney film series
Films about fairies and sprites